Colegio Alemán Stiehle de Cuenca is a German international school in Cuenca, Ecuador. It serves years 1–12.

References

External links
  Colegio Alemán Stiehle de Cuenca

German international schools in Ecuador
Cuenca, Ecuador